"Music Box" is a song by American rapper Eminem, featured on his 2009 album Relapse: Refill, the reissue of his album Relapse.

Content and production
In the song Eminem raps through the eyes of a sadistic killer who likens his prey to a delicious meal, fueled by the haunting sound of his music box. The production was praised as "minimalistic, which consists simply of deep bass thump and a looping toy-chest's song, which provides the perfect backdrop for Eminem's ferocious delivery."

Track listing
iTunes digital single

Charts

References

2010 singles
Eminem songs
Songs written by Eminem
Songs written by Dr. Dre
Songs written by Mark Batson
Song recordings produced by Dr. Dre
Aftermath Entertainment singles
2009 songs
Horrorcore songs
Songs written by Dawaun Parker